Dillon Jeffrey Stevens, (born April 23, 1997) is an actor, dancer, and singer born in Concord, North Carolina.  Stevens currently resides in Concord.

Career

Dillon began his dance training with Center Stage Dance Company in China Grove, North Carolina at the age of five.  He has been dancing there for almost 10 years.

Stevens has performed as a tap soloist at "Showstopper" regionals as well as performing in the opening number for Nationals in Myrtle Beach in 2009.

After being discovered by a New York "Older Billy" at Encore DCS Nationals in Charleston, South Carolina in 2009, Stevens was cast in the role of Michael in the Chicago production of Billy Elliot The Musical.

Dillon graduated from Jesse Carson High School in June 2015.

Stage Credits

References

External links 
 Center Stage Dance Company
 Showstopper Online

1997 births
Living people
American male child actors
People from Concord, North Carolina
American male dancers
People from China Grove, North Carolina